Adam Willis may refer to:

Adam Willis (footballer) (born 1976), English former footballer
Adam Willis (Neighbours), a fictional character from the Australian soap opera, Neighbours